Rear Admiral William Nelson Little (December 31, 1852 – January 4, 1925) was a United States naval officer who was court martialed in 1915 on charges of negligence during his inspection of the submarine . This was one of the few times that a retired military person was court martialed. He was not convicted, but Secretary of the Navy Josephus Daniels censured him for leaving the Navy no legal recourse against the Electric Boat Company for having supplied defective submarine batteries.

Little was born in Newburgh, New York, on December 31, 1852. He graduated from the United States Naval Academy in 1875 and was promoted to rear admiral in 1913.

After his death, Little was interred at Arlington National Cemetery with his wife Catherine Platt "Kate" (Sewell) Little.

References

1852 births
1925 deaths
19th-century American naval officers
20th-century American naval officers
Burials at Arlington National Cemetery
Military personnel from New York (state)
People from Newburgh, New York
United States Naval Academy alumni
United States Navy rear admirals
United States Navy personnel who were court-martialed